Curling is a minor sport in Turkey. It is governed by the Turkish Ice Skating Federation and has been a member of the World Curling Federation since 2009. The country has one dedicated curling venue, the Milli Piyango Curling Arena in Erzurum. Turkey is ranked 39th in the world in men's curling and 31st in women's.

As of November 2012, there are around 180 licensed curlers in the country, of which 120 are playing actively.

Turkey has already hosted four international tournaments, the 2011 Winter Universiade, the 
2012 World Mixed Doubles Curling Championship, the 2012 European Mixed Curling Championship and the European Curling Championships – Group C competitions.

Leagues
The Turkish Ice Skating Federation increased the number of curling leagues setting up the Second Curling League in the 2012-13 season. The First Curling League is played by 20 teams consisting of ten men's and ten women's teams in five groups each four teams. The competitions are held at the Milli Piyango Curling Arena in Erzurum, and will last until end of March 2013. The Second League teams to be promoted to the First League will be determined by play-offs at the end of the season.

Turkish Curling First League teams
Following teams compete in the First League's 2012-13 season

International competitions
The country competed in its first event at the 2010 European Mixed Curling Championship, where they placed 23rd of 24 teams. They won one game, against the Netherlands.

Turkey's first participation in juniors category was in the 2013 European Junior Curling Challenge in Prague, Czech Republic, a qualification tournament for the 2013 World Junior Curling Championships.

Turkish national wheelchair curling team, which consisted of curlers all from İstanbul Büyükşehir Belediyesi S.K., made its debut in November 2012 at the 2013 World Wheelchair Curling Championship – Qualification Event in Lohja, Finland.

National teams

Men's
Men's national curling team of Turkey ranks 35th as of mid-year rankings for the 2012–13 curling season coming up to an increase of five positions from the last season.

Junior men's
Turkish junior men's team debuted at the 2013 European Junior Curling Challenge, a qualification competition for the 2013 World Junior Curling Championships.

Coach: Celal Cüneyt İşgör

Women's
Turkey women's national curling team ranks 27th as of mid-year rankings for the 2012–13 curling season coming up to an increase of four positions from the last season.

Junior women's
Turkish junior women's team debuted at the 2013 European Junior Curling Challenge, a qualification competition for the 2013 World Junior Curling Championships.

Coach: Celal Cüneyt İşgör

Wheelchair

Coach: Gökçe Ulugay

Achievements

Men's events
 Winter Universiade

European Curling Championships
The team advanced to the Group B competitions of 2012 European Curling Championships held in Karlstad, Sweden. Turkey's Alican Karataş competed in the round robin tournament of the Red Group, at which eight teams took part. He skipped to rank six winning two games and losing five.

 International tournaments
 5th Debrecen Curling Bonspiel Cup - July 27–29, 2012 Debrecen, Hungary

Junior men's events
European Junior Curling Challenge

Coach: Celal Cüneyt İşgör

Women's events
 Winter Universiade

European Curling Championships
The team advanced to the Group B competitions of 2012 European Curling Championships held in Karlstad. Elif Kızılkaya skipped to rank five in the round robin tournament, at which ten teams took part, with four wins against five losses, and missed so to advance to the page playoffs that were eligible for the four best teams.

Junior women's events
European Junior Curling Challenge

Mixed events
World Mixed Doubles Curling Championship

European Mixed Curling Championships

Wheelchair
World Wheelchair Curling Championship – Qualification Event

References

External links
Association Website
WCF Member Associations 

 
C